Abacetus punctatostriatus is a species of ground beetle in the subfamily Pterostichinae. It was described by Straneo in 1940.

References

punctatostriatus
Beetles described in 1940